The 2016 Stony Brook Seawolves football team represented Stony Brook University in the 2016 NCAA Division I FCS football season. The Seawolves competed as fourth year members of the Colonial Athletic Association with Chuck Priore as the head coach for his eleventh season. They played their home games at Kenneth P. LaValle Stadium in Stony Brook, New York. They finished the season 5–6, 4–4 in CAA play to finish in a tie for sixth place.

Schedule
*Source: Schedule

Game summaries

North Dakota

at Temple

Richmond

Sacred Heart

at Towson

Rhode Island

at Delaware

at New Hampshire

William & Mary

Maine

at Albany

Ranking movements

References

Stony Brook
Stony Brook Seawolves football seasons
Stony Brook Seawolves football